Kathy Troutt (born 14 September 1947) is an English-born model, actress, deep sea diver and dolphin trainer who moved to Australia in 1948.

Diving career
Kathy dived on Sydney Harbour shipwrecks in 1965.

Modeling and acting career
Sports clothes and glamour model throughout the 1960s, she appeared on Skippy the Bush Kangaroo (as herself) as a visiting marine biologist.
Troutt appeared in the documentary Mermaids in Paradise, released to television and cinemas in 1965 by Ben Cropp.

Dolphin training
She worked in pantomime London, England, where she trained dolphins for movies. She was spotted by a representative of director Mike Nichols, where she was to train a dolphin for the feature film The Day of the Dolphin.

Troutt was later hired for similar work for the feature film The Blue Lagoon, in which she also played the body double for Brooke Shields.

This was followed by work as a crew member on Return to the Blue Lagoon and several other feature films later produced in Australia and Asia.

References

External links
 Kathy Troutt official website

1947 births
English television actresses
Living people
People from Bath, Somerset
Australian television actresses
Australian female models
Glamour models